In mathematics, the braid group on  strands (denoted ), also known as the Artin braid group, is the group whose elements are equivalence classes of -braids (e.g. under ambient isotopy), and whose group operation is composition of braids (see ). Example applications of braid groups include knot theory, where any knot may be represented as the closure of certain braids (a result known as Alexander's theorem); in mathematical physics where Artin's canonical presentation of the braid group corresponds to the Yang–Baxter equation (see ); and in monodromy invariants of algebraic geometry.

Introduction
In this introduction let ; the generalization to other values of  will be straightforward. Consider two sets of four items lying on a table, with the items in each set being arranged in a vertical line, and such that one set sits next to the other. (In the illustrations below, these are the black dots.)  Using four strands, each item of the first set is connected with an item of the second set so that a one-to-one correspondence results. Such a connection is called a braid. Often some strands will have to pass over or under others, and this is crucial: the following two connections are different braids:

{| valign="centre"
|-----
| 
|    is different from   

|}

On the other hand, two such connections which can be made to look the same by "pulling the strands" are considered the same braid:

{| valign="centre"
|-----
| 
|     is the same as   

|}

All strands are required to move from left to right; knots like the following are not considered braids:

{| valign="centre"
|-----
| 
   is not a braid
|}

Any two braids can be composed by drawing the first next to the second, identifying the four items in the middle, and connecting corresponding strands:

{| valign="centre"
|-----
| 
|     composed with    
| 
|     yields    

|}

Another example:

The above composition of braids is indeed a group operation. The identity element is the braid consisting of four parallel horizontal strands, and the inverse of a braid consists of that braid which "undoes" whatever the first braid did, which is obtained by flipping a diagram such as the ones above across a vertical line going through its centre. (The first two example braids above are inverses of each other.)

Applications 
Braid theory has recently been applied to fluid mechanics, specifically to the field of chaotic mixing in fluid flows. The braiding of (2 + 1)-dimensional space-time trajectories formed by motion of physical rods, periodic orbits or "ghost rods", and almost-invariant sets has been used to estimate the topological entropy of several engineered and naturally occurring fluid systems, via the use of Nielsen–Thurston classification.

Another field of intense investigation involving braid groups and related topological concepts in the context of quantum physics is in the theory and (conjectured) experimental implementation of so-called anyons.  These may well end up forming the basis for error-corrected quantum computing and so their abstract study is currently of fundamental importance in quantum information.

Formal treatment

To put the above informal discussion of braid groups on firm ground, one needs to use the homotopy concept of algebraic topology, defining braid groups as fundamental groups of a configuration space. Alternatively, one can define the braid group purely algebraically via the braid relations, keeping the pictures in mind only to guide the intuition.

To explain how to reduce a braid group in the sense of Artin to a fundamental group, we consider a connected manifold  of dimension at least 2. That is, an ordered -tuple is in the same orbit as any other that is a re-ordered version of it.

Since we must require that the strings never pass through each other, it is necessary that we pass to the subspace  of the symmetric product, of orbits of -tuples of distinct points. That is, we remove all the subspaces of  defined by conditions  for all . Under the dimension condition  will be connected.

The case where  is the Euclidean plane is the original one of Artin.

Closed braids 

When X is the plane, the braid can be closed, i.e., corresponding ends can be connected in pairs, to form a link, i.e., a possibly intertwined union of possibly knotted loops in three dimensions. The number of components of the link can be anything from 1 to n, depending on the permutation of strands determined by the link. A theorem of J. W. Alexander demonstrates that every link can be obtained in this way as the "closure" of a braid. Compare with string links.

Different braids can give rise to the same link, just as different crossing diagrams can give rise to the same knot. In 1935, Andrey Markov Jr. described two moves on braid diagrams that yield equivalence in the corresponding closed braids. A single-move version of Markov's theorem, was published by in 1997.

Vaughan Jones originally defined his polynomial as a braid invariant and then showed that it depended only on the class of the closed braid.

The Markov theorem gives necessary and sufficient conditions under which the closures of two braids are equivalent links.

Braid index 
The "braid index" is the least number of strings needed to make a closed braid representation of a link. It is equal to the least number of Seifert circles in any projection of a knot.

History
Braid groups were introduced explicitly by Emil Artin in 1925, although (as Wilhelm Magnus pointed out in 1974) they were already implicit in Adolf Hurwitz's work on monodromy from 1891.

Braid groups may be described by explicit presentations, as was shown by Emil Artin in 1947. Braid groups are also understood by a deeper mathematical interpretation: as the fundamental group of certain configuration spaces.

As Magnus says, Hurwitz gave the interpretation of a braid group as the fundamental group of a configuration space (cf. braid theory), an interpretation that was lost from view until it was rediscovered by Ralph Fox and Lee Neuwirth in 1962.

Basic properties

Generators and relations
Consider the following three braids:

Every braid in  can be written as a composition of a number of these braids and their inverses. In other words, these three braids generate the group . Upon reaching the right end, the braid has been written as a product of the 's and their inverses.

It is clear that

(i) ,

while the following two relations are not quite as obvious:

(iia) ,
(iib) 

(these relations can be appreciated best by drawing the braid on a piece of paper).  It can be shown that all other relations among the braids ,  and  already follow from these relations and the group axioms.

Generalising this example to  strands, the group  can be abstractly defined via the following presentation:

where in the first group of relations  and in the second group of relations, . This presentation leads to generalisations of braid groups called Artin groups. The cubic relations, known as the braid relations, play an important role in the theory of Yang–Baxter equations.

Further properties
 The -strand braid group  embeds as a subgroup into the -strand braid group  by adding an extra strand that does not cross any of the first  strands. The increasing union of the braid groups with all  is the infinite braid group .
 All non-identity elements of  have infinite order; i.e.,  is torsion-free.
There is a left-invariant linear order on  called the Dehornoy order.
 For ,  contains a subgroup isomorphic to the free group on two generators.
This map corresponds to the abelianization of the braid group. Since , then   is the identity if and only if  . This proves that the generators have infinite order.

Interactions

Relation with symmetric group and the pure braid group
By forgetting how the strands twist and cross, every braid on  strands determines a permutation on  elements. This assignment is onto and compatible with composition, and therefore becomes a surjective group homomorphism  from the braid group onto the symmetric group. The image of the braid σi ∈  is the transposition . These transpositions generate the symmetric group, satisfy the braid group relations, and have order 2. This transforms the Artin presentation of the braid group into the Coxeter presentation of the symmetric group:

The kernel of the homomorphism  is the subgroup of  called the pure braid group on  strands and denoted . This can be seen as the fundamental group of the space of distinct -tuples of the euclidian plane. In a pure braid, the beginning and the end of each strand are in the same position. Pure braid groups fit into a short exact sequence

 

This sequence splits and therefore pure braid groups are realized as iterated semi-direct products of free groups.

Relation between B3 and the modular group

The braid group  is the universal central extension of the modular group , with these sitting as lattices inside the (topological) universal covering group

.

Here is a construction of this isomorphism. Define

.

From the braid relations it follows that .

We claim ; this isomorphism can be given an explicit form. The cosets  and  map to

Alternately, one common presentation for the modular group is

where

Relationship to the mapping class group and classification of braids
The braid group  can be shown to be isomorphic to the mapping class group of a punctured disk with  punctures. This is most easily visualized by imagining each puncture as being connected by a string to the boundary of the disk; each mapping homomorphism that permutes two of the punctures can then be seen to be a homotopy of the strings, that is, a braiding of these strings.

Via this mapping class group interpretation of braids, each braid may be classified as periodic, reducible or pseudo-Anosov.

Connection to knot theory
If a braid is given and one connects the first left-hand item to the first right-hand item using a new string, the second left-hand item to the second right-hand item etc. (without creating any braids in the new strings), one obtains a link, and sometimes a knot. Alexander's theorem in braid theory states that the converse is true as well: every knot and every link arises in this fashion from at least one braid; such a braid can be obtained by cutting the link. Since braids can be concretely given as words in the generators , this is often the preferred method of entering knots into computer programs.

Computational aspects 
(In essence, computing the normal form of a braid is the algebraic analogue of "pulling the strands" as illustrated in our second set of images above.) The free GAP computer algebra system can carry out computations in  if the elements are given in terms of these generators. There is also a package called CHEVIE for GAP3 with special support for braid groups. The word problem is also efficiently solved via the Lawrence–Krammer representation.

In addition to the word problem, there are several known hard computational problems that could implement braid groups, applications in cryptography have been suggested.

Actions
In analogy with the action of the symmetric group by permutations, in various mathematical settings there exists a natural action of the braid group on -tuples of objects or on the -folded tensor product that involves some "twists".

 

Thus the elements  and  exchange places and, in addition,  is twisted by the inner automorphism corresponding to  — this ensures that the product of the components  of  remains the identity element. As another example, a braided monoidal category is a monoidal category with a braid group action. Such structures play an important role in modern mathematical physics and lead to quantum knot invariants.

Representations
Elements of the braid group  can be represented more concretely by matrices. One classical such representation is Burau representation, where the matrix entries are single variable Laurent polynomials. More generally, it was a major open problem whether braid groups were linear. In 1990, Ruth Lawrence described a family of more general "Lawrence representations" depending on several parameters. Around 2001 Stephen Bigelow and Daan Krammer independently proved that all braid groups are linear. By suitably specializing these variables, the braid group  may be realized as a subgroup of the general linear group over the complex numbers.

Infinitely generated braid groups
There are many ways to generalize this notion to an infinite number of strands. This group, however, admits no metrizable topology while remaining continuous.  

Paul Fabel has shown that there are two topologies that can be imposed on the resulting group each of whose completion yields a different group.  The first is a very tame group and is isomorphic to the mapping class group of the infinitely punctured disk—a discrete set of punctures limiting to the boundary of the disk.  

The second group can be thought of the same as with finite braid groups.  Place a strand at each of the points  and the set of all braids—where a braid is defined to be a collection of paths from the points  to the points  so that the function yields a permutation on endpoints—is isomorphic to this wilder group.  An interesting fact is that the pure braid group in this group is isomorphic to both the inverse limit of finite pure braid groups  and to the fundamental group of the Hilbert cube minus the set

Cohomology

The cohomology of a group  is defined as the cohomology of the corresponding Eilenberg–MacLane classifying space, which is a CW complex uniquely determined by  up to homotopy.
.
So by definition

The calculations for coefficients in  can be found in Fuks (1970).

In 1968 Vladimir Arnold showed that the integral cohomology of the pure braid group  is the quotient of the exterior algebra generated by the collection of degree-one classes , subject to the relations

See also
Artin–Tits group
Braided monoidal category
Braided vector space
Braided Hopf algebra
Change ringing software – how software uses braid theory to model bell-ringing patterns
Knot theory
Non-commutative cryptography

References

Further reading

. In

External links 

CRAG: CRyptography and Groups computation library from the Stevens University's Algebraic Cryptography Center

 expanded further in Behind the Math of "Dance Your PhD," Part 1: The Braid Groups.

 
Knot theory
Low-dimensional topology
Diagram algebras

fr:Tresses (mathématiques)